Feldhofer 1 or Neanderthal 1 is the scientific name of the 40,000-year-old type specimen fossil of the species Homo neanderthalensis, found in August 1856 in a German cave, the Kleine Feldhofer Grotte in the Neandertal valley,  east of Düsseldorf. In 1864 the fossil's description was first published in a scientific magazine and officially named.

However, the find was not the first Neanderthal fossil discovery. Other Neanderthal fossils had been discovered earlier, but their true nature and significance had not been recognized, and therefore no separate species' name was assigned.

The discovery was made by limestone quarry miners. Neanderthal 1 consists of a skullcap, two femora, the three right arm bones, two of the left arm bones, ilium, and fragments of a scapula and ribs. The fossils were given to Johann Carl Fuhlrott, a local teacher and amateur naturalist. The first description of the remains was made by anatomist Hermann Schaaffhausen and the find was announced jointly in 1857.

In 1997, the specimen was the first to yield Neanderthal mitochondrial DNA fragments.

In 1999, scientists announced that recent excavations had led them to some of the sediments of the now-destroyed cave which contained fragments of Neanderthal bones including one that fit exactly to the original femur.

In 2000, the fossil of a second individual from the locality, named Neanderthal 2, was identified as a Homo neanderthalensis.

The Neanderthal 1 publication represents the beginning of paleoanthropology as a scientific discipline. The fossil has been preserved in the Rheinisches Landesmuseum Bonn since 1877. As well as the unique historical and scientific importance of this specimen it has continued to play a key role since its discovery.

Discovery

Limestone has been mined in the Neander Valley since the early 16th century. From the mid 19th century it has been carried out on an industrial scale. In August 1856 two Italian workers extended the entrance to the Kleine Feldhofer Grotte by removing the naturally sintered, and therefore rock-hard, clay layers which were embedded into the limestones of the cave.

The bones came to the attention of the cave's owner Wilhelm Beckershoff, who assumed them to be the remains of a cave bear. Beckershoff and quarry co-owner Friedrich Wilhelm Pieper retrieved 16 bones and fragments from the rubble and handed them to the Elberfelder teacher and fossil collector Johann Carl Fuhlrott. A skullcap with a fragment of the left temporal bone, a fragment of the right scapula, a right clavicle, both humerus (the right side complete), a complete right radius, fragments of right and left forearm bones, five ribs, an almost complete left half of the pelvis and both femora - were completely preserved.

Fuhlrott allegedly immediately recognized the remains as those of a human who significantly differed from modern man. Without Fuhlrott's approval, the following notice was published on September 4, 1856 in the Elberfeld newspaper and the Barmer local Journal:

In neighboring Neanderthal, a surprising discovery was made in recent days. The removal of the limestone rocks, which certainly is a dreadful deed from a picturesque point of view, revealed a cave, which had been filled with mud-clay over the centuries. While clearing away this clay a human skeleton was found, which undoubtedly would have been left unconsidered and lost if not, thankfully, Dr. Fuhlrott of Elberfeld had secured and examined the find. Examination of the skeleton, namely the skull, revealed the individual belonged to the tribe of the Flat Heads, which still live in the American West and of which several skulls have been found in recent years on the upper Danube in Sigmaringen. Maybe the find can help to settle the issue of whether the skeleton belonged to an early central European original inhabitant people or simply to one of Attila's roaming horde's men.

This report brought the find to the attention of two Bonn professors of anatomy, Hermann Schaaffhausen and August Franz Josef Karl Mayer. They contacted Fuhlrott and asked him to send the bones. Fuhlrott personally brought them to Bonn the following winter, where Schaaffhausen had them examined. Six months later, on 2 June 1857 Schaaffhausen and Fuhlrott presented the results of their investigations to the members of the Natural History Society of the Prussian Rhineland and Westphalen. Paleo-anthropologist and primatologist Ian Tattersall describes the results as follows:

Here Fuhlrott summarized the history of discovery of these fossils, which was based on a careful survey of the workers who had excavated the finds. He emphasized the age of the bones, which was obvious by both, the thickness of the overlying strata [...] as well as by the strong mineralization and dendrite formation on the surface, which were also found in the bones of the extinct giant cave bears. The description and interpretation of the find was Schaaffhausen's task.

Schaaffhausen described the unusually massive bone structure of the find in detail and particularly noted the shape of the cranium - especially the low, sloping forehead and the bony ridges above the eyes:

He considered these characteristics to be natural, rather than the results of illness or abnormal development. They reminded him of the Great Apes. Nevertheless, this was not an ape, and if its features were not pathological, they must be attributed to the age of the find. [...] Although his own search for specimens that were similar to Neanderthal was unsuccessful, he came to the conclusion that the bones belonged to a representative of a native tribe who had inhabited Germany before the arrival of the ancestors of modern humans.

Schaaffhausen published his findings in 1858 in the Archives of Anatomy, Physiology and Scientific Medicine. A year later Fuhlrott published a Treatise on Human remains from a rock grotto of the Düssel valley in the team sheet of the Natural History Society of the Prussian Rhineland and Westphalen. In this essay he also discussed the anatomical conditions and mentioned initially reluctant (also taking into account their integration in glacial loam-drifts) that these bones probably "come from prehistoric times, probably from the diluvial period and therefore belong to an archetypal individual of our race." Following his comments on the geology of the locality he suspected the effect that "these bones are ante-diluvial (before the biblical flood), forms of fossil human remains".

Fuhlrott's and Schaaffhausen's ultimately correct interpretation of the finds was not taken seriously by scholars of their time. As Fuhlrott published his treatise in 1859 in the team sheet of the Natural History Society of the Prussian Rhineland and Westphalen, the members of the editorial commented his interpretations with the postscript that he "put forward views, that cannot be shared."

Historical background

In 1758 Carl Linnaeus published the 10th edition of his work Systema Naturae. The name Homo sapiens as a species name was introduced to the public, but without a known diagnosis and without precise description of the species-specific characteristics.

In 1833 the Dutch physician and naturalist Philippe-Charles Schmerling described a fossil skull and several other bones, which were discovered in 1829 in a cave near the Belgian municipality of Engis. He deduces their age by comparing them with animal fossils and stone tools, which he found in the same strata and associated them with the Pleistocene. However, this first scientifically described Neanderthal was misunderstood by colleagues as "modern". It lacked the criteria discriminating fossil species of the genus Homo with those of Homo sapiens. Moreover, many colleagues referred to the Bible (Genesis 1), suggesting finds from such a high age could not be determined.

Even Thomas Henry Huxley, a supporter of Darwin's theory of evolution, saw in the find of Engis a "man of low degree of civilization". The finding in the Neandertal he also interpreted to be within the range of variation of modern humans. Also the 1848 discovered and relatively well-preserved skull Gibraltar 1 of the Forbes limestone Quarry in Gibraltar was recognized only decades later to be tens of thousands of years old and firmly established as to be a representative of Homo neanderthalensis.

Like Huxley before them, anthropologists of the late 19th and early 20th century still tended to classify and consider the increasingly more numerous hominid fossils as representatives of early "races" of modern man.

Subject of scholarly debate

The fossil of the Neanderthal was discovered in 1856, three years before the publication of Darwin's work On the Origin of Species. Yet the scientific debate over whether species are immutable or mutable had already been going on for a long time. Hermann Schaaffhausen considers in an 1853 treatise about the durability and transformation of species "...that species were not immortal, that they have just as the life of the individual being a beginning, a time of blooming and of demise, only in larger time intervals, and that the various life forms also vary greatly in life-span."  Schaaffhausen, who also had emphasized the close proximity of various anatomical and physiological characteristics of man and the anthropoid apes, concludes in his summary:"...the immutability of species which is considered a law of nature by most researchers, has not yet been proven".

However, Hermann Schaaffhausen was not a scientific authority in mid 19th century Germany. Here biological sciences were at that time dominated by Rudolf Virchow, "...the father of modern Cell biology, who, for political reasons opposed evolutionary thought. Virchow advocated socialist ideals. He fought for a society in which not the origin, but the skills of the individual should decide on his future. The theory of evolution was an elitism to him, any inherent preference for a particular 'race' was incompatible with his ideals."

Before Virchow had the opportunity to see the Neanderthal bones in person in 1872, he left them to Bonn anatomist and eye specialist August Franz Josef Karl Mayer, "a resolute supporter of the Christian belief of creation in its traditionalist form". Mayer had missed the first evaluation of the fossils during winter 1856/57 due to illness:

He confirmed the Neanderthaler's "rickety" changes in bone development[...]. Mayer argued, among other things, that the thigh and pelvic bones of the Neanderthal man were shaped like those of someone who had spent all his life on horseback. The broken right arm of the individual had only healed very badly and resulting permanent worry lines due to the pain were the reason for the distinguished brow ridges. The skeleton was, he speculated, that of a mounted Russian Cossack, who had roamed the region in 1813/14 during the turmoils of the wars of liberation from Napoleon.

Mayer's interpretations, published in 1864 in the Archive of Anatomy disagreed with the then already known and generally accepted Symptoms of Rickets (weakened bones), since Neanderthal had extremely strong bone. Nevertheless, Virchow largely accepted the anatomical findings of Mayer. Virchow described the bones as a "remarkable individual phenomenon" and as "plausible individual formation", this being the reason why the characteristics of the Neandertal finds were seen as a form of pathological change in the skeleton of modern man in German-speaking countries for many years to come.

Even the accurate assessment of geologist Charles Lyell did not change this, who as early as 1863 after a visit to Fuhlrott and the Neandertal had confirmed the antiquity of the find. Yet seen with the benefit of hindsight, the turning point towards the recognition of the find as not being pathologically had already occurred in 1863/64.

In 1864 Irish geologist William King published a detailed description of the physique of the Reputed Fossil Man of the Neanderthal, in which he - largely due to the absence of other comparative possibilities - emphasized the apelike characteristics of the fossil. At the very end of this essay, in one of his footnotes, King mentions that one year prior he had given a lecture of similar contents at the geological section of the British Association for the Advancement of Science, yet by now he is even more convinced that the fossil, which he at that time had called "Homo Neanderthalensis", is generally distinct from man. This casual name, chosen by King for the Neandertal fossil in footnote 27 has become the official species name in accordance with the international rules for zoological nomenclature.

In 1863 British paleontologist George Busk, who had Schaaffhausen's treatise translated into English in 1861, came into possession of the 1848 in the Forbes' Quarry discovered Gibraltar 1 skull. Due to its similarity to Neandertal 1 he scoffed that even Professor Mayer should find it hard to suspect "that a "rickety" cossack of the campaign of 1814 would have holed up in the clefts of the rock of Gibraltar". Final recognition of Neanderthal man as a distinct species separate from Homo sapiens only came after 1886, after two almost complete Neanderthal skeletons were found in the Spy Cave in Belgium.

Anthropological analysis
The 19th century discussion first focused on the question of how the anthropological findings had to be reconciled with characteristics of Homo sapiens. Already Johann Carl Fuhlrott had noticed the unusual massiveness of the bones, the highly trained bumps, ridges and ledges that supported the attachment of vigorously trained muscles. One of the humerus had, according to his observation a healed injury. William King also referred to the unusual thickness of the skeletal bones, agreeing with Schaaffhausen, who had also evaluated the strongly rounded shape of the ribs and thus a quite unusual thorax for a human. King mainly concentrated on the construction of the preserved skull bones. He described the shape as to be "stretched oval" and about an inch longer than that of a recent British person. The width of the skull, however hardly surpassed the width of modern man. As Schaaffhausen before him, King described the forehead region as unusually flat, fleeing and "excessively developed" bone strips above the eyes. In his synopsis of characteristics, that deviated from modern humans, King wrote:

In these general characters the Neanderthal skull is at once observed to be singularly different from all others which admittedly belong to the human species; and they undoubtedly invest it with a close resemblance to that of a young Chimpanzee.

Intravital injuries and illnesses
Göttingen pathologist Michael Schultz also devoted his investigations at the beginning of the 21st century to the health of the Neanderthal holotype. He diagnosed pathological muscle tendon processes in several cases, a fracture of the left arm in the area of the elbow joint with a resulting deformity of the bone. The deformity resulted in a permanent impairment, as the man of the Neanderthal could no longer utilize the arm even after the healing of the fracture.

On the frontal bone is a healed bone injury that is attributed to the fall on a sharp stone. Moreover, Neanderthal 1 obviously had suffered a healed bleeding of a circulatory brain vessel, which is also attributed to an intravital (during his lifetime) traumatic event. Neanderthal 1 suffered from extensive inflammation of the paranasal sinuses. Both frontal sinuses can be seen deformed, humped and covered with small vessel traces - symptoms of chronic inflammation. With advanced age he also suffered from a serious disease that had never before been determined on a Neanderthal - a metastatic, bone-eating process of still unknown cause.

His age at death was determined to be 40 to 42 years.

Postmortem changes of the skeleton
In 1992, alleged cut marks on the skeletal remains were published, particularly those at the edges of the skull, which might suggest a specific burial rite. Given the rudimentary state of conservation of the skeleton (16 of 203 bones) the likelihood of tooth scratches caused by carnivores is also conceivable. Yet taking the superficial and non-scientific recovery of the bones into account, the question of disarticulation (dispersion of skeletal structure by predators) remains difficult to clarify.

Excavations of 1997 and 2000

From 1991 on, the Neanderthal bones were re-analyzed by an international team of researchers. Radiocarbon dating yielded an age of 39,900 ± 620 years, which suggests these individuals belonged to the last populations of this human species in Europe. In 1997 the research team succeeded in extracting mitochondrial DNA from the humerus of the type specimen, the first sample of a Neanderthal mtDNA ever. Results, though, were interpreted very carefully in the publication of this first analysis. Nevertheless, evidence led to the conclusion that Neanderthals were genetically distinct from anatomically modern humans. The title of the Cell journal issue read: "Neanderthals were not our ancestors". The decoding of the Neanderthal genome in 2010 relativized this statement, though (see section below).

Also in 1997 excavations in the Neander Valley determined and reconstructed the exact location of the former "Little Feldhof Grotto". Underneath layers of residue, loam fillings and blasting rubble of the limestone quarry, a number of stone tools and a total of more than 20 Neanderthal bone fragments were discovered. No stone tools had been unearthed from the cave prior. In 2000 the excavations continued and a further 40 human teeth and bone fragments were discovered, including a piece of the temporal and the zygomatic bone, which accurately fit into the Neanderthal 1 skull. Another bone fragment could be associated precisely to the left femur.

Particular attention was given to the discovery of a third humerus: two humeruses were already known since 1856. The third humerus represents the remains of a second, more delicately built individual; at least three other bone fragments are also present twice. Called Neandertal 2, the find was dated at 39 240 ± 670 years old, exactly as old as Neanderthal 1. Moreover, a milk tooth was recovered and attributed to an adolescent Neanderthal. In 2004 it was stolen from the Neanderthal Museum in Erkrath, but returned a short time later. Based on the state of abrasions and the partly dissolved dental roots it was concluded, that it belonged to an 11–14 years old juvenile.

The site was turned into an archaeological garden, its installations symbolize the eventful history of the place. The park is part of the neighboring Neanderthal Museum, which exhibits a chronological outline of human evolution.

Relation to modern man
A 2008 study by the Max Planck Institute for Evolutionary Anthropology in Leipzig suggested Neanderthals probably did not interbreed with anatomically modern humans, while the Neanderthal genome project published in 2010 and 2014 suggests that Neanderthals did contribute to the DNA of modern humans, including most non-Africans as well as a few African populations, through interbreeding, likely between 50,000 and 60,000 years ago.

See also

 Dawn of Humanity (2015 PBS documentary)
 Engis 2
 Gibraltar 1
 List of fossil sites (with link directory)
 List of human evolution fossils (with images)
 Mauer 1
 Neanderthal
 Neanderthals of Gibraltar
 Origins of Us (2011 BBC documentary)
 Prehistoric Autopsy (2012 BBC documentary)
 The Incredible Human Journey (2009 BBC documentary)

References

External links

  from the Minnesota State University, Mankato
 
 Human Timeline (Interactive) – Smithsonian, National Museum of Natural History (August 2016).

Neanderthal fossils
1856 archaeological discoveries
Archaeological discoveries in Europe
Archaeological discoveries in Germany
August 1856 events